Valley Heights USD 498 is a public unified school district headquartered in Waterville, Kansas, United States.  The district includes the communities of Waterville, Blue Rapids, and nearby rural areas.

Schools
The school district operates the following schools:
 Valley Heights Jr/Sr High School - 2274 6th Rd. between Blue Rapids and Waterville
 Blue Rapids Elementary School - 508 Chestnut St. in Blue Rapids
 Waterville Elementary School - 307 East Lincoln St. in Waterville

See also
 Kansas State Department of Education
 Kansas State High School Activities Association
 List of high schools in Kansas
 List of unified school districts in Kansas

References

External links
 

School districts in Kansas